SS Hecla may refer to the following ships:

 , a Dutch cargo ship lost in 1885
 , a Liberty ship built for the UK, but taken over by the United States Navy as USS Xanthus (AR-19)

See also

Notes

Ship names